The Chicago Palestine Film Festival is an annual film festival begun in 2001 in Chicago and is one of the most important venues in the US for the screening of Palestinian cinema. It accepts works in a variety of genres — documentaries, dramas, comedies — in both long and short formats. Although the organizers "are especially interested in work by Palestinian filmmakers,...nationality is not a selection criteria."

The initial intention was for the festival to be hosted at the University of Illinois at Chicago. However, the University refused to host the event if there wasn't an Israeli film festival alongside. For this reason, the decision was made to make this a citywide festival funded by the local community. During the first festival, movies were shown for free at the Preston Bradley Center in Uptown. Subsequent festivals have been held at various locations throughout the city, and screenings are no longer free.

Directors and actors often appear at the festival and discuss their movies with the audience after the screening. In addition, speakers often appear to discuss matters related to Palestine, Israel, the art of filmmaking, and the challenges of being an émigré artist.

See also
 The Sons of Eilaboun
Boston Palestine Film Festival
DC Palestinian Film and Arts Festival

References

External links
Chicago Palestine Film Festival
Babelmed.net

Arab-American culture in Chicago
Film festivals in Chicago
Palestinian-American culture
Cinema of the State of Palestine
2001 establishments in Illinois
Film festivals established in 2002